Rizzardo Brenioli (28 June 1930 – 15 December 1993) was an Italian racing cyclist. He rode in the 1958 Tour de France.

References

External links
 

1930 births
1993 deaths
Italian male cyclists
Place of birth missing
Sportspeople from the Province of Parma
Cyclists from Emilia-Romagna